Hérodiade is an opera in four acts by Jules Massenet to a French libretto by Paul Milliet and Henri Grémont, based on the novella Hérodias (1877) by Gustave Flaubert. It was first performed at the Théâtre de la Monnaie in Brussels on 19 December 1881.

The libretto is a retelling of the story of John the Baptist, Salome, Herod Antipas and Herodias, but is strikingly less psychological and bloody than Richard Strauss's Salome, which is based on a text by Oscar Wilde. The opera premiered in Brussels because Auguste Vaucorbeil, Manager of the Paris Opera house refused to stage the work; "I do like your music," he had said to Massenet, "but as for the libretto, you badly need an author who knows how to build the skeleton of a play."

Performance history
The opera reached Paris at the Théâtre des Nations on 1 February 1884, and the final performance of the run on 13 March featured the three De Reszkes; Jean (Jean), Édouard (Phanuel), and Josephine (Salomé). It was produced at the Théâtre-Italien in 1903 for 43 performances, then at the Gaîté-Lyrique in 1904, 1911 and 1912. The Italian premiere was at La Scala on 23 February 1882.

Roles

Synopsis

Act 1
In a courtyard outside Hérode's palace in Jerusalem. After a short introduction merchants are seen arguing; they are calmed by Phanuel who urges co-operation with the Romans.

Salomé enters, desperately seeking her mother Hérodiade, who sent her away when she married King Hérode. Salomé is also looking for the prophet Jean with whom she had found comfort in her absence from the city.

Hérode has a passion for Salomé and comes from the palace. He is joined by his wife Hérodiade who asks him to act against Jean, who has insulted her; when Hérode, aware of Jean's following, refuses, she vows to be avenged by herself. As she curses the prophet, Jean himself enters and the royal pair withdraw in fear. Salomé vows her love to Jean but he only speaks of a greater love, and new faith.

Act 2
First tableau: Hérode's chambers

Slaves dance in order to divert the sleepless Hérode. Hérode next takes a philtre which gives him visions of his Salomé. Phanuel tells the king that the people are calling for the Messiah and acclaim Jean. Hérode however is sure he will defeat the Romans and win his subjects over again.

Second tableau: The palace in Jerusalem

Hérode calls the people to arms against Jerusalem's Roman masters. The Roman consul Vitellius appears and promises to respect the faith of the Israelites and open the temple. Jean, preceded by a joyful crowd and followed by Salomé passes by. Hérodiade notices the reaction of her husband at the sight of the young woman and accuses Jean of wanting to seize power.

Act 3
First tableau: The house of Phanuel

Phanuel asks heaven to say whether Jean is mortal or divine. Hérodiade visits the priest and consults Phanuel who foresees great suffering, while the queen refuses to recognize her daughter in the young woman.

Second tableau: The Holy Temple

Jean has been arrested. Salomé arrives, exhausted, at the prison. Hérode wishes to release Jean in exchange for help in getting the Galileans to help him fight the Romans. Seeing Salomé, he declares his love but she rejects him, saying that she loves one who is greater and stronger than he. Not knowing who she means, Hérode threatens Jean and Salomé with death.

The priests intercede with Vitellius and ask him to condemn Jean, but the consul gives responsibility for the execution to Hérode. Jean refuses to assist the king. Salomé asks to share her fate with that of the prophet – at this Hérode realises whom she loves and condemns them both to death.

Act 4
First tableau: A subterranean vault

Jean, awaiting death in prison questions his soul. Salomé joins him. Jean is led away to execution while Salomé is taken to the king, who has decided to pardon her.

Second tableau: The great hall in the palace

Dances celebrate the Roman victory. Salomé begs Hérodiade to allow her to die alongside Jean, as it was he who looked after her when her mother abandoned her. Hérodiade remains silent. The executioner announces the death of Jean. Salomé draws a dagger and tries to kill the queen, who admits that she is her mother. In despair, Salomé stabs herself and curses Hérodiade.

Noted arias
Act 1 – Salomé: "Il est doux, il est bon"
Act 2 – Hérodiade: "Ne me refuse pas"
Act 2 – Hérode: "Vision fugitive"
Act 3 – Salomé: "C'est Dieu que l'on te nomme"
Act 4 – Jean: "Adieu donc, vains objets qui nous charment sur terre"

Recordings
1961: Jésus Etcheverry conducting the Orchestre Lyrique de Paris with Michèle Le Bris (Salomé), Denise Scharley (Hérodiade), Guy Chauvet (Jean), Robert Massard (Hérode), and Adrien Legros (Phanuel).(Accord Musidisc) (excerpts)
1963: Georges Prêtre conducting the Théâtre National de l'Opéra de Paris with Régine Crespin (Salomé), Rita Gorr (Hérodiade), Albert Lance (Jean), Michel Dens (Hérode), and Jacques Mars (Phanuel).(La Voix de son Maître) (excerpts)
1995: Michel Plasson conducting the Choeur et Orchestre du Capitole de Toulouse with Cheryl Studer (Salomé), Nadine Denize (Hérodiade), Ben Heppner (Jean), Thomas Hampson (Hérode), and José van Dam (Phanuel).(EMI)
1995: Valery Gergiev conducting the San Francisco Opera Orchestra and Chorus with Renée Fleming (Salomé), Dolora Zajick (Hérodiade), Plácido Domingo (Jean), Juan Pons (Hérode), Kenneth Cox (Phanuel). (Sony Classical)

References
Notes
This opera is featured in a scene at the Paris Opera in the 1976 movie Marathon Man.

Sources

Operas by Jules Massenet
French-language operas
Operas
1881 operas
Opera world premieres at La Monnaie
Operas set in the Middle East
Operas based on novels
Operas based on works by Gustave Flaubert
Cultural depictions of John the Baptist
Operas based on the Bible
Operas based on real people
Operas set in the 1st century
Cultural depictions of Salome